Sitakilly  (also Sitakily and Sitakili) is a small town and commune in the Cercle of Kéniéba in the Kayes Region of south-western Mali. The commune includes the town  and 13 villages. At the time of the 2009 census the commune had a population of 27,501.

References

External links
.

Communes of Kayes Region